= Deutsches Turnfest 1933 =

Deutsches Turnfest
- 1933

Tournament information
- Sport: Gymnastics
- Location: Stuttgart, Germany
- Dates: 21 July 1933–31 July 1933
- Host(s): President Paul von Hindenburg
- Participants: 120,000

Tournament statistics
- Attendance: 600,000

The German Turnfest 1933 took place in Stuttgart. It was carried out from 21 to 31 July. The patron was President Paul von Hindenburg. The Turnfest attracted 600,000 people, 120,000 taking part in the games.
